Unilever plc is a British multinational consumer goods company with headquarters in London, England. Unilever products include food, condiments, bottled water, baby food, soft drink, ice cream, instant coffee, cleaning agents, energy drink, toothpaste, pet food, pharmaceutical and consumer healthcare products, tea, breakfast cereals, beauty products, and personal care. Unilever is the largest producer of soap in the world and its products are available in around 190 countries.

Unilever's largest brands include Lifebuoy, Dove, Sunsilk, Knorr, Lux, Sunlight, Rexona/Degree, Axe/Lynx, Ben & Jerry's, Omo/Persil, Heartbrand (Wall's) ice creams, Hellmann's and Magnum.

Unilever is organised into three main divisions: Foods and Refreshments, Home Care, and Beauty & Personal Care. It has research and development facilities in China, India, the Netherlands, the United Kingdom, and the United States.

Unilever was founded on 2 September 1929, by the merger of the British soapmaker Lever Brothers and the Dutch margarine producer Margarine Unie. In the 1930s Unilever acquired the United Africa Company. During the second half of the 20th century, the company increasingly diversified from being a maker of products made of oils and fats and expanded its operations worldwide. It has made numerous corporate acquisitions, including Lipton (1971), Brooke Bond (1984), Chesebrough-Ponds (1987), Best Foods (2000), Ben & Jerry's (2000), Alberto-Culver (2010), Dollar Shave Club (2016) and Pukka Herbs (2017). Unilever divested its specialty chemicals businesses to ICI in 1997. In the 2010s, under the leadership of Paul Polman, the company gradually shifted its focus towards health and beauty brands and away from food brands showing slow growth.

Unilever has a primary listing on the London Stock Exchange and is a constituent of the FTSE 100 Index. Unilever has a secondary listing on Euronext Amsterdam and is a constituent of the AEX index. The completion of the unification of Unilever's Dutch and UK arms under a single London-based entity was announced on 30 November 2020.

History

1921–1940 
In September 1929, Unilever was formed by a merger of the operations of Dutch Margarine Unie and British soapmaker Lever Brothers, with the name of the resulting company a portmanteau of the name of both companies. 
In the 1930s, business grew and new ventures were launched in Africa and Latin America. During this time, Unilever acquired the United Africa Company, created from a merger of the African & Eastern Trade Corporation and the Royal Niger Company, which oversaw British trade interests in present-day Nigeria during the colonial era.
The Nazi occupation of Europe during the Second World War meant that Unilever was unable to reinvest its capital into Europe, so it instead acquired new businesses in the United Kingdom and the United States. 

In 1943, it acquired T. J. Lipton, a majority stake in Frosted Foods (owner of the Birds Eye brand in the UK) and Batchelors Peas, one of the largest vegetables canners in the United Kingdom. In 1944, Pepsodent was acquired.

In 1933, Unilever Indonesia was established in December as Lever Zeepfabrieken N.V. and has operations in Cikarang, West Java at Rungkut, East Java and North Sumatra.

1941–1960 
After 1945, Unilever's once successful American businesses (Lever Brothers and T.J. Lipton) began to decline. As a result, Unilever began to operate a "hands-off" policy towards the subsidiaries and left American management to its own devices.

Sunsilk was first launched in the United Kingdom in 1954. Dove was first launched in the US in 1957. Unilever took full ownership of Frosted Foods in 1957, which it renamed Birds Eye. The US-based Good Humor ice cream business was acquired in 1961. By the mid-1960s laundry soap and edible fats still contributed around half of Unilever's corporate profits. However, a stagnant market for yellow fats (butter, margarine, and similar products) and increasing competition in detergents and soaps from Procter & Gamble forced Unilever to diversify. In 1971, Unilever acquired the British-based Lipton Ltd from Allied Suppliers. In 1978, National Starch was acquired for $487 million, marking the largest ever foreign-acquisition of a US company at that point.

1961–1980 
By the end of the 1970s through acquisitions, Unilever had gained 30 percent of the Western European ice cream market. In 1982, Unilever management decided to reposition itself from an unwieldy conglomerate to a more concentrated fast-moving consumer goods (FMCG) company.

In 1984, Unilever acquired Brooke Bond (maker of PG Tips tea) for £390 million in the company's first successful hostile takeover. In 1986 Unilever strengthened its position in the world skin care market by acquiring Chesebrough-Ponds (merged from Chesebrough Manufacturing and Pond's Creams), the maker of Ragú, Pond's, Aqua-Net, Cutex, and Vaseline in another hostile takeover. In 1989, Unilever bought Calvin Klein Cosmetics, Fabergé, and Elizabeth Arden, but the latter was later sold (in 2000) to FFI Fragrances.

1981–2000 
In 1992, Unilever Ghana was established in July following a merger of UAC Ghana Limited and Lever Brothers Ghana Limited.

In 1993, Unilever acquired Breyers from Kraft, which made the company the largest ice cream manufacturer in the United States.

In 1996, Unilever merged Elida Gibbs and Lever Brothers in its UK operations. It also purchased Helene Curtis, significantly expanding its presence in the United States shampoo and deodorant market. The purchase brought Unilever the Suave and Finesse hair-care product brands and Degree deodorant brand.

In 1997, Unilever sold its speciality chemicals division, including National Starch & Chemical, Quest, Unichema and Crosfield to Imperial Chemical Industries for £4.9 billion.

In 1998, Unilever established a sustainable agriculture programme.

In 2000, Unilever acquired the boutique mustard retailer Maille, Ben & Jerry's and Slim Fast for £1.63 billion, Bestfoods for £13.4 billion. The Bestfoods acquisition increased Unilever's scale in foods in America, and added brands including Knorr, Marmite, Bovril, and Hellmann's to its portfolio. In exchange for European regulatory approval of the deal, Unilever divested itself of Oxo, Lesieur, McDonnells, Bla Band, Royco, and Batchelors.

2001–2010 

In 2001, Unilever split into two divisions: one for foods and one for home and personal care. In the UK, it merged its Lever Brothers and Elida Faberge businesses as Lever Faberge in January 2001.

In 2003, Unilever announced the strategic decision to sell off the Dalda brand in both India and Pakistan. In 2003, Bunge Limited acquired the Dalda brand from Hindustan Unilever Limited for reportedly under Rs 100 crore. On 30 March 2004, Unilever Pakistan accepted an offer of Rs. 1.33 billion for the sale of its Dalda brand and related business of edible oils and fats to the newly incorporated company Dalda Foods (Pvt.) Limited.

In 2002, the company sold its specialty oils and fats division, known as Loders Croklaan, for RM814 million (€218.5 million) to IOI Corporation, a Kuala Lumpur, Malaysia-based oil palm company. As part of the deal, the Loders Croklaan name was maintained. Unilever sold the brands Mazola, Argo & Kingsfords, Karo, Golden Griddle, and Henri's, along with several of its Canadian brands, to ACH Food Companies, an American subsidiary of Associated British Foods.

In 2004, Unilever Bangladesh, which was established in 1964 changed its former name Lever Brothers Bangladesh Ltd to its present name in December 2004, is owned 60.4% by Unilever and 39.6% by the Government of Bangladesh.

In 2007, Unilever partnered with Rainforest Alliance to sustainably source all its tea.

In 2009, Unilever agreed to acquire the personal care business of Sara Lee Corporation, including brands such as Radox, Badedas and Duschdas. The Sara Lee acquisition was completed on 6 December 2010.

In 2010, Unilever acquired the Diplom-Is in Denmark, Unilever announced that it had entered into a definitive agreement to sell its consumer tomato products business in Brazil to Cargill, purchased Alberto-Culver, a maker of personal care and household products including Simple, VO5, Nexxus, TRESemmé, and Mrs. Dash, for US$3.7 billion. acquired EVGA's ice cream brands, which included Scandal, Variete and Karabola, and its distribution network in Greece, for an undisclosed amount.

2011–2020 
In 2012, Unilever announced it would phase out the use of microplastics in the form of microbeads in their personal care products by 2015.

In 2014, Unilever agreed to acquire a majority stake in the China-based water purification company Qinyuan for an undisclosed price, acquired Talenti Gelato & Sorbetto, acquired Camay brand globally and the Zest brand outside of North America and the Caribbean from Procter & Gamble.

In 2015, Unilever acquired British niche skincare brand REN Skincare, This was followed in May 2015 by the acquisition of Kate Somerville Skincare LLC. The company also acquired the Italian premium ice cream maker GROM for an undisclosed amount. Uniliver also separated its food spreads business, including its Flora and I Can't Believe It's Not Butter! brands, into a standalone entity named Unilever Baking, Cooking and Spreading. The separation was first announced in December 2014 and was made in response to declining worldwide sales in that product category.

Unilever bought the United States-based startup company Dollar Shave Club for a reported $1b (£764m) in order to compete in the male grooming market. On 16 August 2016, Unilever acquired Blueair, a supplier of mobile indoor air purification technologies. In September 2016, Unilever acquired Seventh Generation Inc. for $700 million. On 16 December 2016, Unilever acquired Living Proof Inc, a hair care products business.

In 2017, significantly smaller Kraft Heinz made a $143 billion bid for Unilever. The deal was declined by Unilever. On 20 April 2017, Unilever acquired Sir Kensington's, a New York-based condiment maker. On 15 May 2017, the company acquired the personal care and home care brands of Quala, a Latin American consumer goods company. In June, the company acquired Hourglass, a colour cosmetics brand. In July, the company then announced that it had acquired the organic herbal tea business, Pukka Herbs. In September 2017, Unilever acquired Weis, an Australian ice cream business. Later that month Unilever acquired Remgro's interest in Unilever South Africa in exchange for the Unilever South Africa spreads business plus cash consideration. Even later that month, Unilever agreed to acquire Carver Korea, with 2.7billion USD, a skincare business brand of AHC in North Asia. In October 2017, Unilever acquired Brazilian natural and organic food business Mãe Terra. In November, Unilever announced an agreement to acquire the Tazo speciality tea brand from Starbucks. Later in November 2017, the company acquired Sundial Brands, a skincare company. In December 2017, Unilever acquired Schmidt's Naturals, a US natural deodorant and soap company. In December 2017, Unilever sold its margarine and spreads division to investment firm KKR for €6.8bn. The sale was completed in July 2018, and the new company was named Upfield. Upfield's notable brands include Flora, Stork, I Can't Believe It's Not Butter, Rama, Country Crock, Becel, and Blue Band.

Unilever announced that in order to help tackle the global COVID-19 pandemic, it would contribute over 100m through donations of soap, hand sanitiser, bleach and food.

2021–present 

In April 2021, Unilever established a new stand alone beauty business, Elida Beauty.

In August 2021, Florida governor Ron DeSantis placed Unilever on a list of "Scrutinized Companies that Boycott Israel" because it had "no current plan to prevent Ben & Jerry’s from terminating business activities in Israeli-controlled territories." The ice-cream brand has 90 days to stop engaging in "the BDS movement", or the state will no longer contract with the parent company Unilever or any of its subsidiaries.

In November 2021, Unilever agreed to sell most of its tea business under the Ekaterra division to investment firm CVC Capital Partners for €4.5 billion. This deal excluded the Unilever tea business in India, Indonesia and Nepal, and the Lipton Ice Tea joint-venture with PepsiCo. The deal was completed in summer 2022.

Corporate operations

Legal structure 

Unilever has a holding company Unilever PLC and N.V. with Anglo-Dutch structure, which has its registered office at Port Sunlight in Merseyside, United Kingdom and its head office at Unilever House in London, United Kingdom. The company has been restructured several times, for example in 2018 and 2020 (see "history").

In 2018, Unilever announced its intention to simplify this structure by centralising the duality of legal entities and keeping just one headquarters in Rotterdam, abandoning the London head office. Business groups and staff would have been unaffected, as would the dual listing. On 5 October 2018 the group announced it would cancel the restructuring due to concern that the United Kingdom shareholders would lose value if the company fell out of the London FTSE100. A shareholder vote was planned to decide for the listing of a new Unilever Dutch entity, which would have seen Unilever dropping out of the FTSE 100 Index. When it appeared that the vote would fail, due to uncertainty over the Netherlands dividend tax, the scheme was cancelled on 5 October 2018. 

In October 2018, it acquired a 75% stake in the Italian personal-care business Equilibra and acquired the high-end, eco-friendly laundry and household cleaning products company The Laundress for an undisclosed sum. In 2018, UK recruitment website Indeed, named Unilever as the United Kingdom's ninth best private sector employer based on millions of employee ratings and reviews.

In 2020, Unilever announced it has reviewed its corporate structure again and that the company was to merge Unilever N.V. into Unilever PLC forming one holding company to be based in the United Kingdom. However, a Dutch 'exit tax' plan would require Unilever to reconsider this unification.  In September 2020 Unilever's Dutch arm shareholders overwhelmingly voted for the N.V. to merge into the PLC. In October 2020 Unilever announced that 99 percent of shareholders in its UK arm agreed with the merger, i.e., voted to base the group in London. The completion of the unification was announced on 30 November 2020. Since then there is one class of shares.

Senior management 
In January 2019, Alan Jope succeeded Paul Polman as the chief executive officer. The chief financial officer, Graeme Pitkethly, is executive director. Jope will be proposed as joint executive director at Unilever's 2019 AGM.

Previously, Paul Polman was CEO for ten years, succeeding Patrick Cescau in 2009.

In November 2019, Unilever announced that Nils Andersen would be replacing Chairman Marijn Dekkers, who stepped down after three years in the role.

Gallery of global assets

Financial data

Operations 
The three markets of the United States, China and India account for over one third of turnover.

Thirteen brands account for over half of sales.

Branding and advertising 
Unilever's largest international competitors are Nestlé and Procter & Gamble.

Logo 
In 1930, the logo of Unilever was in a sans-serif typeface and all-caps. The current Unilever corporate logo was introduced in 2004 and was designed by Wolff Olins, a brand consultancy agency. The 'U' shape is now made up of 25 distinct symbols, each icon representing one of the company's sub-brands or its corporate values. The brand identity was developed around the idea of "adding vitality to life."

Brands

Dove 

Dove describes itself as being dedicated to "help ... women develop a positive relationship with the way they look – helping them raise their self-esteem and realize their full potential". Dove employs the use of advertising for its products to display its messages of positive self-esteem. In September 2004 Dove created a Real Beauty campaign, focusing predominately on women of all shapes and colour. Later in 2007, this campaign furthered itself to include women of all ages. This campaign consisted mostly of advertisements, shown on television and popularised by the internet. Dove fell under scrutiny from the general public as they felt the Dove advertisements described the opinion that cellulite was still unsightly and that women's aging process was something for which to be ashamed.

Lynx/Axe 
Axe, known as Lynx in the United Kingdom, the Republic of Ireland, Australia and New Zealand, is a toiletries brand marketed towards young men between the ages of 16 and 24. Its marketing is a "tongue-in-cheek take on the 'mating game'", suggesting that women are instantly drawn to men who use the products. Unlike Dove's long-running beauty campaign, Lynx advertising often creates mini-series of advertisements based around a singular product rather than communicating an overarching idea. Using images the company knows it will receive complaints garners the brand more free publicity and notoriety, often through controversy. A wide variety of these adverts have been banned in countries around the world. In 2012, Lynx's 'Clean Balls' advert was banned. In 2011, in the United Kingdom, Lynx's shower gel campaign was banned.

Both advertising campaigns make stark comparisons between how women and their sexuality are portrayed in advertising and sales efficiency. Lynx commonly portrays women as hypersexual, flawless and stereotypically attractive who are aroused by men, of all ages and stature, because of their use of the Lynx product.

Social media advertising 
On 26 June 2020, Unilever said it would halt advertising to U.S. customers on social media giants Facebook, Instagram, and Twitter until at least the end of 2020 following a campaign started by various American civil-rights groups, such as the Anti-Defamation League and the NAACP, protesting Facebook's policies on hate speech and misinformation named "Stop Hate For Profit". though they did not formally sign on to the campaign. Unilever cited "our Responsibility Framework and the polarized atmosphere in the U.S." and said that "continuing to advertise on these platforms at this time would not add value to people and society."

Later that year in December Unilever revealed it would resume advertising on Facebook and its affiliated platforms, stating the company has made enough progress in changing their management to continue advertising with them. Executive vice president of global media for the company, Luis Di Como, released a statement clarifying: "We are encouraged by the commitments the platforms are making to build healthier environments for consumers, brands and society in alignment with the principles of the Global Alliance for Responsible Media. This is why we plan to end our social media investment pause in the U.S. in January. We will continue to reassess our position as necessary."

Environmental record 
Unilever has declared the goal of decoupling its environmental impact from its growth, by halving the environmental footprint of its products by 2030; helping 1 billion people improve their health and well-being; and sourcing all of its agricultural raw materials sustainably. In September 2019, Unilever announced that its sites across five continents are now powered by 100% renewable grid electricity, ahead of its 2020 target. In 2020, Unilever promised to become carbon neutral by 2039.

Mercury contamination 
In 2001, a mercury thermometer factory operated by the Indian subsidiary of Unilever in the South Indian hilltown of Kodaikanal was shut down by state regulators after the company was caught dumping toxic mercury wastes in a densely populated part of town. By the company's own admissions, more than 2 tonnes of mercury were discharged into Kodaikanal's environment. A 2011 Government of India study on workers’ health concluded that many workers suffered from illnesses caused by workplace exposure to mercury. The scandal opened up a series of issues in India such as corporate liability, corporate accountability and corporate negligence.

In March 2016, Unilever reached an out of court settlement (for an undisclosed amount) with 591 ex-workers of the unit who had sued the company for knowingly exposing them to the toxic element.

Palm oil 
In 2014, Unilever was criticised by Greenpeace for causing deforestation. In 2008, Greenpeace UK criticised the company for buying palm oil from suppliers that were damaging Indonesia's rainforests. By 2008, Indonesia was losing 2% of its remaining rainforest each year, having the fastest deforestation rate of any country. The United Nations Environmental Programme stated that palm oil plantations are the leading cause of deforestation in Indonesia.

Furthermore, Indonesia was the 14th largest emitter of greenhouse gases, largely due to the destruction of rainforests for the palm oil industry, which contributed to 4% of global green house gas emissions. According to Greenpeace, palm oil expansion was taking place with little oversight from central or local government as procedures for environmental impact assessment, land-use planning and ensuring a proper process for development of concessions were neglected. Plantations that were off-limits, by law, for palm oil plantations were being established as well as the illegal use of fire to clear forest areas was commonplace.

Unilever, as a founding member of the Roundtable on Sustainable Palm Oil (RSPO), responded by publicising its plan to obtain all of its palm oil from sources that are certified as sustainable by 2015. It claims to have met this goal in 2012 and is encouraging the rest of the industry to become 100% sustainable by 2020.

In Côte d'Ivoire, one of Unilever's palm oil suppliers was accused of clearing forest for plantations, an activity that threatened a primate species, Miss Waldron's red colobus. Unilever intervened to halt the clearances pending the results of an environmental assessment.

According to an Amnesty International report published in 2016, Unilever's palm oil supplier Wilmar International profited from child labour and forced labour. Some workers were extorted, threatened or not paid for work. Some workers suffered severe injuries from banned chemicals. In 2016 Singapore-based Wilmar International was the world's biggest palm oil grower.

Plastic pollution 
In 2019, Unilever was cited by BreakFreeFromPlastic as one of the top ten global plastic polluters. Graham Forbes, Global Plastics Project Leader at Greenpeace, said Unilever's plans to tackle this were the most ambitious he'd seen from a massive conglomerate. He also said that Unilever should commit to more.

Nevertheless, in 2019, Unilever announced that it plans to halve its non-recycled plastic packaging by 2025. In 2020, Unilever joined 13 EU member states and more than 60 companies to sign a pact to use recycled plastic for all plastic packaging and single-use plastic products by 2025.

In June 2022, a Reuters report revealed that Unilever had lobbied the governments of India and the Philippines to stop legislation which would ban the sale of cosmetics in single-use plastic sachets, despite vowing in 2020 to stop using them. The design of these sachets had been called 'evil' by Hanneke Faber, Unilever's President for Global Food and Refreshments, 'because you cannot recycle it'. The bans were then dropped by lawmakers. In Sri Lanka, the company pressed the government to reconsider a proposed ban on sachets, and then tried to manoeuvre around the ban after regulations were implemented.

Rainforest Alliance 

Unilever certifies its tea products by the Rainforest Alliance scheme. The company has stated that at least 50% of the tea in its products originates from certified farms, compared to the Alliance's 30% minimum entry point. Unilever decided on the scheme over Fairtrade, because according to the company's analysis, Fairtrade might "lack the scale and the organizational flexibility to certify industrial tea estates".

The Rainforest Alliance certification scheme has been criticised for not offering producers minimum or guaranteed price, therefore, leaving them vulnerable to market price variations. The alternative certificate, Fairtrade, has received similar criticism. The Rainforest Alliance certification has furthermore been criticised for allowing the use of the seal on products that contain only a minimum of 30% of certified content, which according to some endangers the integrity of the certification.

Salmonella contamination 
In July 2016, rumours about salmonella contamination in cereals spread among Israeli consumers. Initially, Unilever did not provide public information about the subject and queries on the matter were rebuffed by the company as a non-story and nonsense. On 26 July 2016, Unilever had stopped transferring cornflakes to retailer chains. On 28 July, Yedioth Ahronoth reported tens of thousands of boxes of breakfast cereal had been destroyed. By 28 July, despite the company's assurances that nothing contaminated was released for consumption, many customers stopped buying Unilever products and started to throw away all cornflakes made by Unilever. The company withheld information about the affected production dates. Unilever had published more information about Telma cereals handled on the packaging line in which the contamination was discovered and that a Telma announcement had been made: "We again stress that all Telma products in the stores and in your homes are safe to eat. According to our company's strict procedures, every production batch is checked and put on hold. These products are not marketed until test results for this product series are returned, confirming that all is well. If any flaw is discovered, the batch is not marketed to stores, as was the case." In the following days the Health Minister, Yakov Litzman, threatened to pull Unilever's licence in Israel. He accused Unilever of lying to his ministry regarding salmonella-infected breakfast cereals.

On 7 August 2016, Globes reported that contamination may be sourced in pigeon faeces, the Health Ministry said that there might be other sources for the contamination and pigeon faeces are not the only possible source. Globes also said that the production line is automatic ("without human hands") and the possibility that the source is human is a very slim chance. On 8 August 2016, the Israeli Health minister suspended a manufacturing license until Unilever carry out several corrections; the action came after an inspection of the Arad plant, stating "This was a series of negligent mistakes and not an incident with malicious intent by the firm's management and quality control procedures." An investigation led by Prof. Itamr Grutto and Eli Gordon concluded that the event was caused by negligence. Reportedly the cereals produced between the 18th and 20th at the Arad plant had traces of salmonella.

Two class actions were filed in Israel, one for a sum of 1.2 million NIS (~$329K USD) against Unilever for hiding the contamination and misleading the public, and another for a sum of 76 million NIS (~$23m USD) against Unilever after a 15-year-old teen had been hospitalised for Salmonellosis after allegedly contracting it from Unilever products.

On 31 August 2016, Unilever stated that the Tehina products produced by RJM had been contaminated by salmonella.

Controversies

Price-fixing 
In April 2011, Unilever was fined €104 million by the European Commission for establishing a price-fixing cartel for washing powder in Europe, along with Procter & Gamble and Henkel.

In 2016, Unilever and Procter & Gamble were both fined by Autorité de la concurrence in France in 2016 for price-fixing on personal hygiene products.

Hampton Creek lawsuit 
In November 2014, Unilever filed a lawsuit against rival Hampton Creek. In the suit, Unilever claimed that Hampton Creek was "seizing market share" and the losses were causing Unilever "irreparable harm." Unilever used standard of identity regulations in claiming that Hampton Creek's Just Mayo products are falsely advertised because they don't contain eggs. The Washington Post headline on the suit read "Big Food's Weird War Over The Meaning of Mayonnaise." The Los Angeles Times began its story with "Big Tobacco, Big Oil, now Big Mayo?" A Wall Street Journal writer described that "Giant corporation generates huge quantities of free advertising and brand equity for tiny rival by suing it." In December 2014, Unilever dropped the claim.

Pressuring media to promote skin whiteners 
Kinita Shenoy, an editor of the Sri Lanka edition of Cosmopolitan, refused to promote skin whiteners for a brand of Unilever. Unilever put pressure on Shenoy and asked Cosmopolitan to fire her.

Violence against striking workers 
In 2019, security forces hired by Unilever attacked workers that were peacefully picketing at a Unilever facility in Durban in South Africa. Workers were shot at with rubber bullets, pepper spray and paint balls while attempting to walk to their cars parked on the premises. 4 workers were seriously injured.

See also 

 List of food companies

References

Further reading 
 Austin, James and James Quinn. Ben & Jerry’s: Preserving Mission and Brand within Unilever (Harvard Business School Publishing, 2005)
 Fieldhouse, D. K. Unilever overseas: The anatomy of a multinational 1895–1965 (Hoover Institution Press, 1979).
 Jones, Geoffrey. Renewing Unilever: Transformation and Tradition (2005) excerpt
 Sitapati, Sudhir. The CEO Factory: Management Lessons from Hindustan Unilever (2019)
 Wubs, Ben. International business and national war interests: Unilever between Reich and empire, 1939–45 (Taylor & Francis, 2008)

External links 

 
 

Unilever
British companies established in 1929
British Royal Warrant holders
Companies based in the City of London
Companies listed on the London Stock Exchange
Companies listed on Euronext Amsterdam
Companies listed on the New York Stock Exchange
Condiment companies
Cosmetics companies of the United Kingdom
Dental companies
Food and drink companies established in 1929
Food manufacturers based in London
Household and personal product companies of the United Kingdom
Lever family
Manufacturing companies established in 1929
Multinational companies based in the City of London
Multinational food companies
Palm oil
Personal care companies